Events in the year 2018 in Bosnia and Herzegovina.

Incumbents
 President – Bakir Izetbegović, Mladen Ivanić, and Dragan Čović (until November 20) Milorad Dodik, Šefik Džaferović and Željko Komšić (from November 20)
 Prime Minister – Denis Zvizdić

Events

April 
23 April – Radovan Karadžić starts his appeal against his conviction for genocide and other wartime crimes at the UN court at The Hague.
24 April – Italian police arrest a Bosnian driver driving a van loaded with weapons bound for Barcelona.

May 
8 May – Bosnian prosecutors appeal the acquittal of Naser Orić, former commander of the Bosnian Army in Srebrenica, who was accused of killing Serb prisoners.

October 
7 October – General elections were held in the country for the national Presidency, House of Representatives, and government positions in Republika Srpska and the Federation of Bosnia and Herzegovina. Milorad Dodik, Šefik Džaferović and Željko Komšić won the presidential posts.

November 
21 November – Kosovo puts a 100% trade tariff on all goods imported from Bosnia and Herzegovina and Serbia. The European Union says this is a "clear violation" of the Central European Free Trade Agreement.

Deaths

18 February – Nazif Mujić, actor (b. 1970).

3 March – Sabit Hadžić, basketball player and coach (b. 1957).

30 March – Sabahudin Kurt, folk and pop singer (b. 1935).

1 August – Alija Behmen, politician, mayor of Sarajevo (b. 1940).

4 August – Marijan Beneš, boxer (b. 1951).

References

 
2010s in Bosnia and Herzegovina
Years of the 21st century in Bosnia and Herzegovina
Bosnia and Herzegovina
Bosnia and Herzegovina